Villa Carcina (locally ) is a comune in the province of Brescia, in Lombardy.  Neighbouring communes are Concesio and Sarezzo. Situated on the river Mella, it is part of the Trompia valley.

References

Cities and towns in Lombardy